The 2011 Yukon/NWT Men's Curling Championship was held February 10–13 at the Yellowknife Curling Club in Yellowknife, Northwest Territories.  The winning team of Jamie Koe will represent Yukon/NWT at the 2011 Tim Hortons Brier in London, Ontario.

Teams

Standings

Results
All times local (Mountain Standard Time)

Draw 1
February 10, 7:00pm

Draw 2
February 11, 10:00am

Draw 3
February 11, 2:30pm

Draw 4
February 12, 10:00am

Draw 5
February 12, 2:30pm

Draw 6
February 13, 9:30am

External links
Yellowknife Curling Club
Northwest Territories Curling Association

References

Yukon nwt Mens Curling Championship, 2011
Curling in the Northwest Territories
2011 in the Northwest Territories
Curling in Yukon